"Sail Away" is a song by British singer-songwriter David Gray. It was released as the fourth single from his fourth studio album, White Ladder (1998), on 16 July 2001 and charted at number 26 on the UK Singles Chart, number 31 on the Irish Singles Chart, and number 11 on the US Billboard Triple A chart. Remixes by Rae and Christian and Biffco were also commissioned and featured on the single formats. The DVD single features live video footage taken from his concert DVD release David Gray: Live.

Track listings
UK CD and cassette single
 "Sail Away" (Biffco radio edit) – 3:44
 "Sail Away" (Biffco club mix) – 7:02
 "Sail Away" (Rae and Christian Remix) – 5:35

UK DVD single
 "Sail Away" (live at the Point video)
 "Sail Away" (Biffco radio edit audio)
 "This Year's Love" (live at the Point video excerpt)
 "Please Forgive Me" (live at the Point video excerpt)
 "Wisdom" (live at the Point video excerpt)

Personnel
Personnel are lifted from the White Ladder album booklet.
 David Gray – writing, vocals, guitar, piano, keyboards, production
 Craig McClune – bass, keyboards, drums, production
 Iestyn Polson – production
 Marius de Vries – additional production
 Steve Sidelnyk – additional programming

Charts

Certifications

Release history

References

1998 songs
2001 singles
David Gray (musician) songs
East West Records singles
RCA Records singles
Song recordings produced by Marius de Vries
Songs about boats
Songs about oceans and seas
Songs written by David Gray (musician)